Erich Torggler (11 May 1899 – 22 October 1938) was an Austrian painter. His work was part of the painting event in the art competition at the 1936 Summer Olympics.

References

1899 births
1938 deaths
20th-century Austrian painters
Austrian male painters
Olympic competitors in art competitions
People from Kufstein
20th-century Austrian male artists